Lycodon zawi, commonly known as Zaw's wolf snake, is a species of nonvenomous snake in the family Colubridae.  The species is native to South Asia and Southeast Asia

Etymology
The specific name, zawi, is in honor of U Khin Maung Zaw, Director of the Myanmar Nature and Wildlife Conservation Division.

Geographic range
L. zawi is found in Bangladesh, northeastern India (Assam, Meghalaya, Mizoram, Tripura), and Myanmar (formerly called Burma).

Description
Dorsally, L. zawi is brownish black with white crossbands. Ventrally, it is cream-colored. It can grow to 48 cm (19 inches) in total length (including tail).

Habitat

Diet
L. zawi feeds mainly on small lizards such as skinks and geckos.

Reproduction
L. zawi is oviparous.

References

Further reading
Das I (2012). A Naturalist's Guide to the Snakes of South-East Asia: Malaysia, Singapore, Thailand, Myanmar, Borneo, Sumatra, Java and Bali. Oxford, England: John Beaufoy Publishing. 176 pp. .
Majumder J (2018). "Record of Lycodon zawi (Squamata: Colubridae) in Tripura and its range extension in northeast India: an Indo-Burma biodiversity hotspots [sic] of the world". Biodiversity International Journal 2 (3): 303–304.
Slowinski JB, Pawar SS, Win H, Thin T, Gyi SW, Oo SL, Tun H (2001). "A New Lycodon (Serpentes: Colubridae) from Northeast India and Myanmar (Burma)". Proceedings of the California Acadademy of Sciences 52: 397–405. (Lycodon zawi, new species).
Whitaker R, Captain A (2008). Snakes of India: The Field Guide. Chennai: Draco Books. 495 pp. .

zawi
Reptiles of Bangladesh
Reptiles of Myanmar
Reptiles of India
Reptiles described in 2001